Massimo Ornatelli (born 17 January 1986) is an Italian footballer who most recently played for Borussia Dortmund II.

Personal life
Ornatelli was born in Rome to an Italian father and German mother, and moved to Dortmund at a young age.

References

External links

1986 births
Living people
Footballers from Rome
Italian footballers
German footballers
Italian people of German descent
German sportspeople of Italian descent
Borussia Dortmund II players
Arminia Bielefeld players
SC Preußen Münster players
SC Paderborn 07 players
VfL Osnabrück players
FSV Frankfurt players
2. Bundesliga players
3. Liga players
Association football midfielders